The year 2011 in architecture involved some significant architectural events and new buildings.

Events
 February 6 – Cambodian officials claim that "a wing" of the Preah Vihear Temple (11th century) has collapsed due to an alleged Thai bombardment in the Cambodian–Thai border dispute.
 May – Broadcaster BBC North begins its move into Bridge House, Dock House and Quay House, designed by Wilkinson Eyre, at MediaCityUK, Salford Quays, England.
 June 15 – St Paul's Cathedral in London completes its 15-year £40 million restoration project of cleaning and repair, among the largest such projects ever undertaken in the United Kingdom.
 November – The fourth World Architecture Festival is held in Barcelona.
 November 3–11 – Typhoon Haiyan causes widespread destruction in Southeast Asia. Among buildings seriously damaged is Guiuan Church in the Philippines.

Buildings and structures

Buildings opened

 January 11 – Salvador Dali Museum, St. Petersburg, Florida, United States, designed by HOK.
 January 21 – Museum of Old and New Art, on the Berriedale peninsula in Hobart, Tasmania, Australia, designed by Nonda Katsalidis.
 January 25 – New World Center, home of the New World Symphony Orchestra, at Miami Beach, Florida, designed by Frank Gehry.
February 10 — The Granoff Center for the Creative Arts at Brown University, designed by Diller Scofidio + Renfro
 February 28 – Museo Soumaya in Mexico City, designed by Fernando Romero.
 March 1 – Media City Footbridge across the Manchester Ship Canal at MediaCityUK, Salford Quays, England, designed by Gifford and Wilkinson Eyre Architects.
 April 16 – Turner Contemporary art gallery, in Margate, Kent, England, designed by David Chipperfield.
 May 1 – New Lyric Theatre, Belfast, designed by O'Donnell & Tuomey of Dublin.
 May 21 – The Hepworth Wakefield art gallery, West Yorkshire, England, designed by David Chipperfield.
 May 31 – Ponte della Musica-Armando Trovajoli across the Tiber in Rome, Italy, designed by BuroHappold Engineering and Powell-Williams Architects.
 June – Windmill Hill archive centre, Waddesdon, England, designed by Stephen Marshall.
 June 16 – Gothenburg Mosque, Sweden.
 June 20 – Riverside Museum, the new development of the Glasgow Museum of Transport in Scotland, designed by Zaha Hadid Architects.
 June 25 – Peace Bridge across the River Foyle in Derry, Northern Ireland, designed by Wilkinson Eyre Architects.
 July 19 – New Museum of Liverpool, at Liverpool Pier Head, England, designed by architects 3XN and engineers Buro Happold.
 August 27 – Rustavi Sioni, church in Rustavi, Georgia, designed by Besarion Menabde, Nikoloz Abashidze and Nikolos Dadiani (consecration date).
 September – firstsite new art gallery, Colchester, England, designed by Rafael Viñoly.
 September 11 – National September 11 Memorial, Reflecting Absence, on the World Trade Center site in New York City, USA, designed by architect Michael Arad with landscape architect Peter Walker (dedication date).
 September 13 – Westfield Stratford City shopping mall, Stratford, London.
 October 12 – Royal Opera House Muscat opens in Muscat, Oman.
 October 20 — The Human Ecology Building at Cornell University is dedicated. Designed by Gruzen-Samton Architects (IBI Group).
 December 21 – Capital Gate skyscraper hotel and office building, in Abu Dhabi.

Buildings completed

 January
 City of Westminster College, Paddington Green Campus, London, designed by schmidt hammer lassen architects.
 Heron Tower in the City of London, designed by Kohn Pedersen Fox.
 February
 8 Spruce Street, a skyscraper in New York City, USA, designed by Frank Gehry.
 Sunset Chapel, Acapulco, Guerrero, Mexico, designed by BNKR Arquitectura.
 March 29 – London Olympic Stadium, designed by Populous.
 April – Metropol Parasol in Seville, Spain, designed by Jürgen Mayer.
 July 6 – Trump Ocean Club International Hotel and Tower, the tallest building in Panama and Latin America.
 July 27 – London Aquatics Centre, designed by Zaha Hadid.
 September
 CMA CGM Tower in Marseille, designed by Zaha Hadid.
 Aberdeen University New Library in Scotland, designed by Schmidt Hammer Lassen architects.
 October 20 — Milstein Hall at Cornell University, designed by Rem Koolhaas
 October 28 – ArcelorMittal Orbit, designed by Anish Kapoor with Cecil Balmond, erected at Olympic Park, London.
 November
 Canada Water Library in London Docklands, designed by Piers Gough of CZWG.
 Robert H. Jackson United States Courthouse in Buffalo, New York, designed by Kohn Pedersen Fox.
 dates unknown
 N M Rothschild & Sons' New Court banking headquarters in the City of London, designed by Rem Koolhaas's OMA, completed.
 Brockholes Visitor Centre, a floating wooden nature reserve centre designed by Adam Khan of Arca, opens near Preston, Lancashire, England.
 Eighth Avenue Place East in Calgary, Alberta
 Maggie's Centres, drop-in cancer care centres in Great Britain
 Maggie's Gartnavel, Glasgow, designed by Rem Koolhaas's OMA.
 Maggie's Nottingham, designed by Piers Gough and Paul Smith.
 Maggie's South West Wales, Swansea, designed by Kisho Kurokawa (opens December 9).
 Temporary Serpentine Pavilion in London, designed by Peter Zumthor.
 Folly for a Flyover, a 'pop-up' temporary arts centre in East London, England, designed by Assemble.
 New Hospital Pavilion, University of Chicago Medical Center, designed by Rafael Viñoly, projected for completion.
 University of Arizona Science Center, Tucson, designed by Rafael Viñoly, projected for completion.
 The Crystal, Copenhagen, Denmark (part of Nykredit headquarters), designed by Schmidt Hammer Lassen Architects. 
 Kravis Center, Claremont McKenna College, Claremont, California, designed by Rafael Viñoly, projected for completion.

Awards
 AIA Gold Medal – Fumihiko Maki
 Architecture Firm Award – BNIM Architects
 Carbuncle Cup – MediaCityUK
 Driehaus Architecture Prize for New Classical Architecture – Robert A. M. Stern
 Emporis Skyscraper Award – 8 Spruce Street New York City designed by Frank Gehry
 European Union Prize for Contemporary Architecture (Mies van der Rohe Prize) – David Chipperfield
 Grand Prix de l'urbanisme – Michel Desvigne
 Lawrence Israel Prize – David Rockwell
 LEAF Award, Overall Winner – OBR Open Building Research
 Praemium Imperiale Architecture Award – Ricardo Legorreta
 Pritzker Architecture Prize – Eduardo Souto de Moura
 RAIA Gold Medal – Graeme Gunn
 RIBA Royal Gold Medal – David Chipperfield
 Stirling Prize – Zaha Hadid (for the second year running)
 Thomas Jefferson Medal in Architecture – Maya Lin
 International Union of Architects UIA Gold Medal – Álvaro Siza Vieira
 AIA Twenty-five Year Award – John Hancock Tower designed by Pei Cobb Freed & Partners
 UIA Gold Medal – Álvaro Siza Vieira
 Vincent Scully Prize – William K. Reilly

Births

Deaths
 June 6
 Stefan Kuryłowicz, Polish architect (born 1949)
 Amnon Niv, Israeli architect and urban designer (born 1930)
 September 17 – Colin Madigan, Australian architect (born 1921)
 September 27 – Imre Makovecz, Hungarian architect (born 1935)
 October 2 – Efraín Recinos, Guatemalan architect (born 1928)
 October 5 – Enver Faja, Albanian architect (born 1934)
 October 24 – Bruno Weber, Swiss architect (born 1931)
 November 25 – Karel Hubacek, Czech architect (born 1924)
 December 12 – Gene Summers, American architect (born 1928)
 December 26 – Kiyonori Kikutake, Japanese architect, co-founder of the Metabolist group. (born 1928)
 December 27 – Anne Tyng, American architect (born 1920)
 December 30 – Ricardo Legorreta, Mexican architect, UIA Gold Medalist (born 1931)

See also
Timeline of architecture

References

 
21st-century architecture